Floyd Sam Nunis (December 16, 1903 – February 1, 1980) was a pioneering figure in American stock car racing, being involved in both the American Automobile Association and the National Stock Car Racing Association.

Career
Nunis worked with the American Automobile Association to promote stock car racing in the late 1940s, encouraging the group to promote the sport, which they had previously written off, in addition to AAA's traditional sanctioning of IndyCar races. He primarily promoted races at Lakewood Speedway near Atlanta in Georgia, both under AAA sanction and under the aegis of the National Stock Car Racing Association, which he co-operated along with Weyman Milam between 1946 and 1951.

References
Citations

Bibliography

External links
Sam Nunis Article at Taurtoise Motor Sports

1903 births
1980 deaths
Auto racing executives
American motorsport people